The 2004 Northeast Conference men's basketball tournament was held in March. The tournament featured the league's top eight seeds. Monmouth won the championship, its third, and received the conferences automatic bid to the 2004 NCAA Tournament.

Format
The NEC Men’s Basketball Tournament will consist of an eight-team playoff format with the quarterfinal and semifinal games played at the Spiro Sports Center in Staten Island, NY. The Championship game was played at the court of the highest remaining seed, Monmouth.

Bracket

 Semifinal game, CCSU vs. FDU went into overtime.

All-tournament team
Tournament MVP in bold.

References

Northeast Conference men's basketball tournament
Tournament
Northeast Conference men's basketball tournament
Northeast Conference men's basketball tournament
Northeast Conference men's basketball tournament